The 5th Indonesian Choice Awards ceremony (Official name: Indonesian Choice Awards 5.0 NET.), presented by the NET., honored the best entertainment of the year in 2018, and took place on April 29, 2018, at the Sentul International Convention Center in Bogor, West Java, at 7:00 p.m. WIB.

The awards ceremony aired live on NET. coinciding with the fifth anniversary celebration, entitled NET 5.0: Upgraded. The annual awards have presented by Sarah Sechan, Vincent Rompies and Desta (3rd time overall).

In addition to local musicians, NET. also featured international musician and artists, such as Craig David, Hailee Steinfeld, and Light Balance.

Voting System 
Voting for 2018 Indonesian Choice Awards opened on March 30th, 2018 on Twitter for hashtag #ICA _5#<nominees_category>

Performers

Presenters 
 Sheryl Sheinafia and Boy William - Presented Breakthrough Artist of the Year
 Darto and Danang - Presented Band/Group/Duo of the Year
 Angel Karamoy and Panji Suryono - Presented Music Video of the Year
 Yuliandre Darwis - Presented TV Program of the Year
 Addie MS - Presented Creative & Innovative Person of the Year Hesti Purwadinata and Beddu - Presented Digital Persona of the Year Sule and Andre Taulany - Presented Instrumental Album of the Year Niken Anjani and Ibnu Jamil - Presented Actress of the Year Shahnaz Soehartono and Ganindra Bimo - Presented Album of the Year Vanesha Precilla and Dodit Mulyanto - Presented Actor of the Year Raisa and Isyana Sarasvati - Presented Male Singer of the Year Via Vallen and Deva Mahenra - Presented Female Singer of the Year Triawan Munaf - Presented Lifetime Achievement Award Aubry Beer and Rizky Febian - Presented Movie of the Year Adinda Thomas and Tanta Ginting - Presented Song of the Year'''

References 
Indonesian Choice Awards
2018 music awards